The 1997 America East men's basketball tournament was hosted by the Delaware Blue Hens at Bob Carpenter Center . The final was held at Case Gym on the campus of Boston University. Boston University gained its fourth overall America East Conference Championship and an automatic berth to the NCAA tournament with its win over Drexel. Boston University was given the 12th seed in the Midwest Regional of the NCAA Tournament and lost in the first round to Tulsa 81–52. Drexel University gained a bid to the NIT and lost in the first round to Bradley 66–53.

Bracket and Results

See also
America East Conference

References

America East Conference men's basketball tournament
1996–97 America East Conference men's basketball season
1997 in sports in Massachusetts
Basketball competitions in Boston
College basketball tournaments in Massachusetts
College basketball tournaments in Delaware